Brewers Fayre is a licensed pub restaurant chain, with 161 locations across the UK as of August 2018. Owned by Whitbread, Brewers Fayre restaurants are known for serving traditional British pub food and for their Sunday Carvery.

History

The first Brewers Fayre pub opened in 1981 near Preston, and was called The "Farmers Arms". Vic and Jean Ellis took over the pub in 1979 and Whitbread promised a refurbishment if they returned a profit (which they did within a year). The original brand name was suggested as "Brewery Fayre" but was tweaked.

In 1995, 50 outlets were added, at a cost of £85 million, taking the total to 280. At this time the Charlie Chalk Fun Factory was added to about thirty pubs. In 1996, 52 were opened, with 17 having a Travel Inn next door; most were built near motorways. In early 1997, Whitbread introduced the Kiln & Kettle chain, which was similar to Brewers Fayre but without the focus on children. Around the same time, 90 more outlets opened. In October 1999, Whitbread formed a pubs and bars division (2,900 outlets) and a restaurants division (1,300 outlets) which included Brewers Fayre, which was headed by Bill Shannon. In September 2001, 34 outlets (five in Scotland) were put up for sale. In 2003, it was announced that 35 outlets per year would be added over the next five years.

Disposals, closures and re-branding

In the past, there were many stand-alone Brewers Fayre pubs, but in 2006 Whitbread agreed to scrap the 239 stand-alone Brewers Fayre and Beefeater sites. These had traditionally lower revenues, and, as growth had stalled in them compared to the still-growing Premier Inn sites, they were seen as an obstacle to the company's sales growth. The sites were sold to market rival Mitchells & Butlers and over the year after they were sold, pubs were re-branded to Harvester, Toby Carvery, and a selection of other brands. A large number of sites became Crown Carveries (formerly Pub & Carvery), and this sparked growth in the brand, which originally consisted of only a small number of pubs throughout the UK.  From 2016 Crown Carveries have been re-branded "Stonehouse Pizza & Carvery" 

A small number of stand-alone Brewers Fayre sites were retained where there was land on which a Premier Inn could be built, such as The Three Bells near Lymington and The Craigside Inn in Llandudno. In 2008, Whitbread sold a further 44 Brewers Fayre & Beefeater sites to Mitchells and Butlers, where planning permission for a Premier Inn was not possible (such as The Lauriston Farm in Edinburgh) in exchange for 21 Express by Holiday Inn hotels, which were converted to Premier Inn.

Other brands

Brewers Fayre Local
A small number of sites were renamed Brewers Fayre Local. These pubs originally had a different menu but on the inside were designed more or less like a Table Table restaurant. The spin-off brand did not appear to work as planned, and they are now just known as Brewers Fayre and have the same menu.

Brewsters
In 1999, 120 restaurants were re-branded as Brewsters in an endeavor to differentiate a set of more family-oriented pubs from those more suited to adults. Whilst its environment and food offerings were similar to those of Brewers Fayre, Brewsters placed a greater emphasis on entertaining children; pubs had a multi-level play area known as the 'Fun Factory', children's entertainers, and ice-cream machines. The brand's slogan was "Fun for kids, relaxing for parents". Another 30 outlets were added in the three years that followed. Many of Brewsters sites were Brewers Fayre sites with Charlie Chalk Fun Factories. The brand was often voted "The Most Family Friendly Restaurant Chain In The Country" by the baby charity Tommy's. In July 2001, the brand launched a national TV campaign called 'Break From The Old Routine', with the Oui 3 song of the same name as the soundtrack.

Despite Whitbread's best efforts, in 2004, Brewsters sales began to slow down. As a result, the company integrated the majority of its 149 restaurants back into the original Brewers Fayre brand during 2005, in an effort to reverse the negative trend. The Brewsters brand had been completely phased out by the end of August. The 2004-05 annual report indicated it was beneficial for Brewers Fayre, not only because Brewsters was focused too much on young families and had lost its credibility with adult diners, but also because Brewers Fayre was focusing too much on the adult market and was trying to establish a more family-friendly attitude. All 149 outlets had kept their indoor fun factories, but a small number had these factories reduced in size and were known as Play Zones.

Table Table

In late 2006, a small number of Brewers Fayre restaurants were refurbished, bringing in a more contemporary theme. The first site was Newhouse, in Motherwell (which opened in June 2006 as a pilot). The restaurants were not officially given a brand name. However, some kept the name Brewers Fayre but the logo was black instead of red, while other sites were signed as "Contemporary Dining & Drinking". In autumn 2007, further Brewers Fayre sites were changed to this new brand and then again in February 2008. On 18 May 2008 Whitbread launched the brand as "Table Table". About 100 sites were re-branded in total, but new sites opened after 2008 have all been new builds. Brewers Fayre has now stopped refurbishing its sites with this brand. Table had grown to 111 outlets by mid-2012. However, Brewers Fayre has now converted a number of Table Table sites back to Brewers Fayre such as The Phoenix Park in Paisley in Renfrewshire. In 2017, further sites were re-branded into the Beefeater restaurant chain.

Taybarns
Starting in December 2007 with the Swansea Vale Brewers Fayre, six restaurants were converted to the Taybarns format and one was bought from a rival company. This was an all-you-can-eat buffet restaurant. Whitbread announced plans to convert more Brewers Fayre sites to the Taybarns brand during 2009 and 2010 but this never happened, partly due to their high cost. Despite the success of Taybarns, it was announced in March 2016 that all sites would be returned to the Brewers Fayre brand starting with the site near Barnsley (The Wentworth) and the last site to change was South Shields which closed in September 2016.

Brewers Fayre Buffet Place
Although a majority of Brewers Fayre pubs featured hot counters (Buffet Place now "our Chef's Counter") as part of their restaurants, the sites in Widnes and Barry were named 'Brewers Fayre Buffet Place'. They feature a larger buffet counter with buffets available all the time. Extras such as cakes and salads are also available. The theme of the restaurant is also slightly different stepping away from the pub theme. In spite of this, these restaurants are now just run as normal Brewers Fayre pubs.

Cookhouse & Pub
Late 2017 has seen Whitbread launch a new brand "Cookhouse & Pub." The first site was the former Lakeside in Oldbury which opened on 12 October. The Stonebrook, The Cotton Mill Kilmarnock, Butterley Park Ripley was re-branded in November 2017 and new build sites in 2018 are open in Bridlington and Rhyl. 'Cookhouse and Pub' have a very contemporary theme.  More new builds and conversations have taken place during 2019.

Rejuvenation

After opening The Harbour in Carrickfergus in County Antrim, Northern Ireland, in early 2006, Brewers Fayre opened no pubs for over two years until The Wobbly Wheel near Banbury was rebranded from Millers Kitchen. Despite the previous policy of disposals and rebranding of Brewers Fayres sites, the chain has seen a resurgence in popularity fueled by new menu offers such as two for £9 meal deals in late 2007, along with an option for two desserts for £2 in October 2009, and two starters for £2.50 in 2015. In late 2008 a refurbishment programme was launched. All sites were given a small makeover featuring a new colour scheme, new carpets, and paintings in the restaurants. Some of the first sites to be refurbished were The Meadows near Barnsley and The Oaks at Norwich Airport.

On 31 March 2009 the new theme began with a new logo featuring the new slogan "Pub Food as it Should Be" printed on the menus. Sites continued to be refurbished, with the last site refurbished in 2010. New external signage was given to each pub at this time as well.

In December 2009, The Papermill in High Wycombe was refurbished and hot counters were added in the restaurant. To host theme nights on weekdays in addition to the main menu. After a successful trial at this location the programme was rolled out to further Brewers Fayre locations in September 2010 and then again during 2011. In September 2010 theme nights were introduced to all pubs, including those without buffet counters. These included "Pie Nights" and "Fish & Chip Shop Nights". This was a more cost-effective solution than conversion to a Taybarns or a Table Table restaurant, formats which currently have higher sales and profits than Brewers Fayre. According to Whitbread, it was "benefiting from sales at its Brewers Fayre and Premier Inn chain" in a 2011 economy in which "domestic price pressures [are] near their highest levels in two decades".

In January 2011, Brewers Fayre opened its first new-build site in five years, Malt & Myre, at Lomondgate Drive, Dumbarton. The second-ever Brewers Fayre to open in Ireland opened in November 2012 as part of the Premier Inn at Crescent Link on the Waterside in Derry. Ireland's first Brewers Fayre is The Harbour in Carrickfergus.

Fun Factories and Play Zones
Most Brewers Fayre sites have some sort of children's play area. A few pubs feature an outdoor children's play area. All sites which were known as Brewsters have a big indoor multi-level soft play area known as the Fun Factory, with the exception of a small number of pubs which cut the size of the fun factories to make way for more dining space and renamed them Play Zones. Brewster the Bear was the firm's own mascot who appeared in the indoor Fun Factories (and occasionally dining areas) until 2015. Brewers Fayre originally had Charlie Chalk as their mascot, but he was replaced after the take over of Brewsters in 1999. A few Brewers Fayre sites which did not become Brewsters also had Charlie Chalk Fun Factories which kept running until they were eventually sold in 2007.

Brewers Fayre specialises in birthday parties for children, allowing private use of the Fun Factory.

In 2013, along with a refurbishment in the Brewers Fayre brand launched a new themed children's menu with The Beanos Dennis the Menace as the new mascot, which was previously meant to feature Scooby-Doo. In 2015, all Fun Factories and Play Zones were refurbished and incorporated the Dennis the Menace theme and renamed "Play at Brewers Fayre".

References

External links
 
 

Restaurant groups in the United Kingdom
Pub chains
1980 establishments in the United Kingdom
Dunstable
Whitbread divisions and subsidiaries